Daleké Dušníky is a municipality and village in Příbram District in the Central Bohemian Region of the Czech Republic. It has about 400 inhabitants.

Administrative parts
The village of Druhlice is an administrative part of Daleké Dušníky.

References

Villages in Příbram District